The 2012 Brisbane Broncos season was the 25th in the club's history. Coached by Anthony Griffin and captained by Sam Thaiday, they competed in the NRL's 2012 Telstra Premiership, finishing the regular season eighth (out of sixteen) to make it into the finals. The Broncos were then knocked out of contention in the first game of the finals against the North Queensland Cowboys. So began the Broncos' longest ever premiership drought.

Season summary

Milestones
Round 1: Nick Slyney made his debut for the club, after previously playing for the North Queensland Cowboys.
Round 3: Sam Thaiday played his 150th career game.
Round 4: Josh McGuire played his fiftieth career game.
Round 8: Josh Hoffman played his fiftieth career game.
Round 9: Ben Hunt played his fiftieth career game and Peter Wallace his 100th game for the club.
Round 10: Luke Capewell made his debut for the club, after previously playing for the South Sydney Rabbitohs and Gold Coast Titans.
Round 10: Matt Gillett played his fiftieth career game.
Round 12: Ben Hannant played his 100th game for the club.
Round 13: Gerard Beale played his fiftieth career game.
Round 14: Brendon Gibb, Lachlan Maranta and Jarrod Wallace made their debuts for the club.
Round 14: Lachlan Maranta scored his first career try and Ben Te'o played his 100th career game.
Round 16: Petero Civoniceva played his 300th career game.
Round 17: Aaron Whitchurch made his debut for the club.
Round 17: Aaron Whitchurch scored his first career try.
Round 20: Corey Parker played his 250th career game.
Round 21: Ben Hannant played his 150th career game.
Round 26: Andrew McCullough played his 100th career game.
Elimination Final: Justin Hodges played his 200th career game.

Squad list

Squad movement

Gains

Losses

Re-signings

Contract lengths

Ladder

Fixtures

Pre-season

Regular season

Finals

Statistics

Source:

Representatives
The following players appeared in a representative match in 2012.

Australian Kangaroos
Ben Hannant
Justin Hodges
Sam Thaiday

Indigenous All Stars
Justin Hodges
Sam Thaiday
Jharal Yow Yeh

New Zealand Kiwis
Alex Glenn
Josh Hoffman
Gerard Beale

NRL All Stars
Jack Reed

Prime Minister's XIII
Josh McGuire
Ben Te'o

Queensland Maroons
Matt Gillett
Ben Hannant
Justin Hodges
Corey Parker
Sam Thaiday
Ben Te'o

Honours

League
Nil

Club
Player of the year: Andrew McCullough
Rookie of the year: Lachlan Maranta
Back of the year: Justin Hodges
Forward of the year: Alex Glenn
Club man of the year: Jess West/Terry Gray

References

Brisbane Broncos seasons
Brisbane Broncos season